Klimeschia vibratoriella is a moth in the family Douglasiidae. It was described by Josef Johann Mann in 1862. It is found in Turkey.

References

Moths described in 1862
Douglasiidae